Paracobitis salihae is a species of stone loach found in the Euphrates River.

References

salihae
Fish of Asia
Taxa named by Davut Turan
Taxa named by Jörg Freyhof
Fish described in 2020